Nambui (fl. 1294) was a Khongirad empress consort of the Yuan dynasty. She was married to Kublai Khan after the death of his first wife Chabi.

Biography 
Her birthdate is unknown. She was daughter of Nachen Küregen from Khongirad, brother of Chabi. She was married to Kublai in 1283 after the death of Chabi in 1281. After his principal wife's death, Kublai started to live in Nambui's ordo, admitted only a very limited circle of people, and his ministers had to submit reports and reports to the khan through Nambui. According to some sources, in the last years of his reign, Kublai even allowed Nambi to issue important decrees on his behalf, but there are no concrete examples to prove this. Nambui bore him a son called Temechi, who was Kublai's youngest son. She went missing in 1290 with her son Temechi.

References 

Year of birth missing
Yuan dynasty empresses
13th-century Mongol rulers
13th-century Mongolian people
13th-century Chinese women
13th-century Chinese people
13th-century Mongolian women